Charenton-le-Pont is a commune in the southeastern suburbs of Paris, France. It is one of the most densely populated municipalities in Europe.

The Charenton Psychiatric Hospital is located in the neighbouring commune Charenton-Saint-Maurice, which changed its name in 1842 to Saint Maurice.

History
A Bronze Age hoard of weapons was found in the river Seine at Charenton in the late nineteenth century. Comprising swords, axes, spearheads and other miscellaneous objects, it is now in the British Museum.

Charenton was always a point of importance for the defence of the capital, and was frequently the scene of bloody conflicts. The fort of Charenton, located in Maisons-Alfort but intended to defend Charenton, is one of the older forts of the Paris defence.

In the 16th and 17th centuries, Charenton was the scene of the ecclesiastical councils of the Protestant party, which had its principal church in the town.

In the now-named commune St Maurice, adjoining Charenton to the east, is the Hospice de Charenton, a psychiatric hospital, the foundation of which dates from 1641. Until the time of the Revolution it was used as a general hospital, and even as a prison, but from 1802 onwards it was specially appropriated to the treatment of mental illness.

On 1 January 1860, the city of Paris was enlarged by annexing neighbouring communes. On that occasion, half of the commune of Bercy was annexed to the city of the Paris, and the remaining half was annexed to Charenton-le-Pont.

In 1929, the commune of Charenton-le-Pont lost about a third of its territory when the city of Paris annexed the Bois de Vincennes, a small part of which belonged to Charenton-le-Pont.

Population

Transport
Charenton-le-Pont is served by two stations on Paris Métro Line 8: Liberté and Charenton — Écoles.

Education
 the commune has 14 public and private schools.
Public preschools (écoles maternelles): 4 vents, Cerisae, Champ des Alouettes, Conflans, Port au Lions, and Valmy 
Public elementary schools: Briand A, Briand B, Desnos, Pasteur, and Valmy
Collège la Cerisaie (junior high school)
Lycée Robert Schuman (public senior high school/sixth-form college)
Notre dame des Missions (private school, elementary through senior high school/sixth form college)

Sport
Charenton shares the association football club CA Paris-Charenton with the nearby town Maisons-Alfort. They play in all red with blue shorts. They are a merger between CA Paris (founded in 1892)—who won the 1920 Coupe de France, were second place in the 1928 Coupe de France, played in the first two seasons of Ligue 1, and then played in Ligue 2 until 1963—and SO Charentonnais (founded in 1904). The two merged in 1964. The club is chaired by Oscar Gonçalves. They mainly play at the Stade Henri Guérin in Charenton, but also play many matches at the Stade Charentonneau in Maisons-Alfort.

Twin towns - Sister cities

Charenton-le-Pont is twinned with:

 Borgo Val di Taro, Emilia Romagna, Italy
 Büren, North Rhine-Westphalia, Germany
 Trowbridge, Wiltshire, United Kingdom
 Tempelhof-Schöneberg, Berlin, Germany
 Zikhron Ya'akov, Haifa District, Israel

Economy
 Essilor, headquarters
 Natixis, the bank has three sites (Liberté 1, Liberté 2 et Bercy) with around  people
 Crédit Foncier de France, headquarters at 4 quai de Bercy
 Porto Cruz, plant and distribution platform

See also
Communes of the Val-de-Marne department

References

External links

 
 Charenton-le-Pont city council website (in French)
 Historical notes (in French)

Communes of Val-de-Marne